is a Japanese director of anime. He graduated from the Animation Department of Tokyo Design Academy and worked as a freelancer at Toei Animation. His most notable work has been as a series director for One Piece, including two of its feature films. Other works directed include Ginga e Kickoff!!, Rainbow Fireflies, Majin Bone, and Days. He currently works mainly for MAPPA.

Filmography

TV series
One Piece (1999-2006) - Director
The File of Young Kindaichi (2007) - Director
Ginga e Kickoff!! (2012-2013) - Director
Majin Bone (2014) - Director
One Piece: Adventure of Nebulandia (2015) - Director
DAYS (2016) - Director, series composition
One Piece: Episode of Skypiea (2018) - Chief director
Hinomaru Sumo (2018-2019) - Chief director, series composition

Films
One Piece: Dead End Adventure (2003) - Director
One Piece: The Giant Mechanical Soldier of Karakuri Castle (2006) - Director
Rainbow Fireflies (2012) - Director'

References

External links
 
 

Anime directors
People from Shizuoka Prefecture
Living people
1966 births